Mockford is a surname. Notable people with the surname include:

Alex Mockford (born 1981), English rugby union player
Ben Mockford (born 1989), English basketball player
Harold Mockford (born 1932), English painter
Jeanne Mockford (born 1926), English actress
Maureen Mockford (1940–2008), Northern Irish badminton player and bowler